The archery competitions at the 2018 Mediterranean Games in Tarragona took place between 22 and 24 June at the Campclar Atlhetics Stadium.

Athletes competed in four recurve archery events.

Medal summary

Medalists

Medal table

References

External links
2018 Mediterranean Games – Archery
Results Book

 
Sports at the 2018 Mediterranean Games
2018
Mediterranean Games
International archery competitions hosted by Spain